The River Bain Hydro is a hydroelectric generator on the River Bain in the village of Bainbridge, North Yorkshire, England. Its screw turbine powers most of the properties in the village, with excess electricity being sold off to the National Grid. It was opened in 2011 with an installed capacity of 45 kW  and is expected to last 40 years. It is a low-demand ecofriendly scheme.

History
A hydro-power plant had been in existence on the site since the late 19th century. Like the new scheme, this was locally run but was wound up (as Bainbridge Electricity Supply) in 1953 when the National Grid took over supplying power to the area.

The plant, which was funded by a grant, a bank loan and a public share issue and cost £450,000 to build, opened in May 2011 and supplies enough power for 40 homes in the village of Bainbridge.

See also
Settle Hydro
Torrs Hydro, New Mills

References

Hydroelectric power stations in England
Power stations in Yorkshire and the Humber
Buildings and structures in North Yorkshire
Hydroelectric power stations in Yorkshire and the Humber